Carl O'Donnell (born 21 May 1987, Rotorua) is a New Zealand swimmer. He competed in the 4 × 100 metre medley relay event at the 2012 Summer Olympics.

References

1987 births
Living people
New Zealand male swimmers
Olympic swimmers of New Zealand
Swimmers at the 2012 Summer Olympics

Sportspeople from Rotorua
20th-century New Zealand people
21st-century New Zealand people